Sheffield Hallam can refer to:

 Sheffield Hallam University, a university in Yorkshire, England
 Sheffield Hallam (UK Parliament constituency), a parliamentary constituency in Sheffield, England